Weiler (Luxembourgish: Weiler or Weller) is a village in northeastern Luxembourg.

It is situated in the commune of Putscheid and has a population of 146.

Gallery

References 

Villages in Luxembourg